Class 3 may refer to:

 BR Standard Class 3 2-6-0, British steam locomotive
 BR Standard Class 3 2-6-2T, British steam locomotive
 Classes of U.S. Senators
 L&YR Class 3, British 4-4-0 steam locomotive
 SCORE Class 3, off-road racing trucks
 The third class in terms of hiking difficulty in the Yosemite Decimal System
 A class in US truck classification
 Class 3, in the electrical Appliance classes
 A contribution class in the National Insurance system in the UK

See also
 Class III (disambiguation)
 Class 03 (disambiguation)
 NSB El 3, Norwegian electric locomotive
 NSB Di 3, Norwegian diesel locomotive